Plumb Branch (also known as Plum Branch) is a stream in Linn County in the U.S. state of Missouri.

Plumb Branch was named for the wild plum timber near its course.

See also
List of rivers of Missouri

References

Rivers of Linn County, Missouri
Rivers of Missouri